Harry Jones may refer to:

Sports

Association football (soccer)
Harry Jones (footballer, born 1891) (1891–1947), English international football player
Harry Jones (footballer, born 1911) (1911–1957), English football player 
Harry Jones (Welsh footballer) (fl. 1911–1915), Welsh football player for Port Vale

Rugby union
Harry Jones (rugby union, born 1878) (1878–1930), Welsh international rugby union player
Harry Jones (rugby union, born 1989), Canadian international rugby union player
Harry Jones (rugby union, born 1992), New Zealand rugby union player for Waikato
Harry Jones (rugby union, born 1995), Australian professional rugby union player for the New South Wales Waratahs

Other sports
Harry Jones (American football) (born 1945), American football player who played for the Philadelphia Eagles from 1967 to 1970
Harry Jones (Australian footballer, born 1911) (1911–1997), Australian rules football player for Collingwood
Harry Jones (footballer, born 1999), Australian rules football player for Hawthorn
Harrison Jones (footballer) (born 2001), Australian rules football player for Essendon
Harry Jones (cricketer, born 1922) (1922–1995), Welsh cricketer
Harry Jones (sailor) (1895–1956), Canadian sailor who competed in the 1932 Olympics

Others
Harry Jones (actor), American/British actor, in Dark Towers
Harry Edward Jones (1843–1925), British civil engineer 
Harry Thomson Jones (1925–2007), British racehorse trainer
Harry Wild Jones (1859–1935), American architect
Harry Jones, a minor character in Raymond Chandler's The Big Sleep
Harry Longueville Jones (1806–1870), archaeologist
Harry Jones (British Army officer) (1791–1866), British general
Harry Jones (politician) (1840–1936), Welsh-born prospector and political figure in British Columbia
Harry Jones, Tracy Beaker and The Dumping Ground character

See also
Harold Jones (disambiguation)
Henry Jones (disambiguation)